Endian may refer to:

 Endianness, the order of the bytes, comprising a digital word, in computer memory
 Endian Firewall, a Linux distribution of the South Tyrolean company Endian

See also
 Big-endians, a fictional group in Gulliver's Travels